Adlafia minuscula is a species of diatoms belonging to the family Anomoeoneidaceae.

Synonym:
 Navicula minuscula Grunow (= basionym)

References

Cymbellales